The Potomac primary (named after the river that splits the region),  also called Chesapeake Tuesday, the Beltway primary, and the Crabcake primary, is the confluence of three Democratic presidential primaries and three Republican presidential primaries that takes place after Super Tuesday in the states of Maryland and Virginia as well as in the District of Columbia.

2008

Republican primaries 
2008 District of Columbia Republican presidential primary
2008 Maryland Republican presidential primary
2008 Virginia Republican presidential primary

Democratic primaries 
2008 District of Columbia Democratic presidential primary
2008 Maryland Democratic presidential primary
2008 Virginia Democratic presidential primary

Results 
The results on both sides were fairly unsurprising according to opinion polling, with both John McCain and Barack Obama winning by substantial margins. For Obama, however, the race had been significant as a major source of delegates in the close Democratic race, with him garnering a net gain of 50 delegates.

2012

Republican primaries 
2012 District of Columbia Republican presidential primary
2012 United States presidential election in Maryland

Democratic primaries 
President Barack Obama ran unopposed.

Results

2016
In the 2016 election, on both the Republican and Democratic sides, Maryland, Virginia and the District of Columbia held their primaries on three separate days. Virginia's 2016 primaries were part of Super Tuesday, while Maryland's took place on April 26. The Democrats of the District of Columbia held their primary on June 14, while the District's Republicans instead opted for a caucus, which took place on March 12.

References

External links
Reuters FACTBOX-The Feb. 12 "Potomac Primary" presidential contest

United States presidential primaries
Washington, D.C., presidential primaries
Maryland presidential primaries
Virginia presidential primaries